Albert Fairclough (4 October 1891 – 5 November 1958), sometimes known as Fairy Fairclough, was an English professional footballer who played as a centre forward in the Football League for Bristol City, Derby County, Southend United, Gillingham and Manchester City.

Career
A centre forward, Fairclough began his career in non-league football, before he and his brother Peter transferred to First Division club Manchester City in March 1913. The First World War hampered Fairclough's career at Hyde Road, though he top-scored for the club's reserve team in the 1913–14, 1914–15 and 1919–20 seasons. He made just five first team appearances for City, scoring one goal. In May 1920, Fairclough dropped down to the Third Division to join Southend United and earned the distinction of scoring the club's first Football League goal. He subsequently played in all three divisions of the Football League and scored 88 goals in 163 league appearances for Southend United, Bristol City, Derby County and Gillingham, before retiring at the end of the 1926–27 season.

Personal life 
Fairclough was the older brother of footballer Peter Fairclough. In October 1915, 14 months after the outbreak of the First World War, Fairclough enlisted in the Loyal North Lancashire Regiment. He was later appointed a lance corporal and saw action on the Western Front, Salonika and Egypt.

Honours
Bristol City
Football League Third Division South: 1922–23

Career statistics

References

1891 births
1958 deaths
Association football forwards
Bristol City F.C. players
British Army personnel of World War I
Derby County F.C. players
Eccles United F.C. players
English Football League players
English footballers
Footballers from St Helens, Merseyside
Gillingham F.C. players
Loyal Regiment soldiers
Manchester City F.C. players
Southend United F.C. players